Commander-in-Chief, Ireland, was title of the commander of the British forces in Ireland before 1922. Until the Act of Union in 1800, the position involved command of the distinct Irish Army of the Kingdom of Ireland.

History

Marshal of Ireland
The title Marshal of Ireland was awarded to William Marshal, 1st Earl of Pembroke after the Norman conquest of Ireland and was inherited by his nephew John Marshal and descendants. This hereditary ceremonial title is latterly called Earl Marshal of Ireland to distinguish it from the later non-hereditary military appointment of Marshal of Ireland or Marshal of the Army. Holders of the latter appointment by letters patent included:

 Sir William Brereton (1540)
 Sir Francis Bryan (November 1548)
 Sir Nicholas Bagenal (March 1547–1553; October 1565–October 1590) In 1553 deprived by Mary I. In 1566 failed to sell the office to Thomas Stukley
 Walter Devereux, 1st Earl of Essex (1569 "high marshal"; 1576 "earl marshal" for life) 
 Henry Bagenal (from 24 October 1590) son of Nicholas, secured the succession in 1583
 Sir Richard Bingham (1598)
 Edward Conway, 2nd Viscount Conway (31 January 1640; patent 2 April 1640)
 Sir Henry Tichborne (1660)

From 1700
In the 18th and 19th centuries the British forces in Ireland were commanded by the Commander-in-Chief, Ireland. In January 1876 a ‘Mobilization Scheme for the forces in Great Britain and Ireland’ was published, with the ‘Active Army’ divided into eight army corps based on the District Commands. 4th Corps was to be formed within Irish Command, based in Dublin. This scheme disappeared in 1881, when the districts were retitled ‘District Commands.

The 1901 Army Estimates introduced by St John Brodrick allowed for six army corps based on six regional commands. As outlined in a paper published in 1903, III Corps was to be formed in a reconstituted Irish Command, with HQ at Dublin. Field Marshal The Duke of Connaught was appointed acting General Officer Commanding-in-Chief (GOCinC) of III Corps in October 1901. The title was withdrawn in 1904.

Army Order No 324, issued on 21 August 1914, authorised the formation of a 'New Army' of six Divisions, manned by volunteers who had responded to Earl Kitchener's appeal (hence the First New Army was known as 'K1'). Each division was to be under the administration of one of the Home Commands, and Irish Command formed what became the 10th (Irish) Division. It was followed by 16th (Irish) Division of K2 in September 1914.

In the Republic of Ireland, the "supreme command of the Defence Forces" is formally vested in the President of Ireland under the Constitution. The Chief of Staff is the senior officer. In Northern Ireland from 1922 to 2009, the senior British military appointment was General Officer Commanding Northern Ireland.

Commanders-in-Chief, Ireland, 1700–1922
Holders of the post have included:
Lieutenant General Thomas Erle 1701–1705
Lieutenant General Lord Cutts 1705– January 1707;
Lieutenant General Richard Ingoldsby February 1707–January 1712;   
General William Steuart 1711–1714
Lieutenant General Lord Tyrawley 1714–1721
Field Marshal Lord Shannon 1721–1740
Lieutenant-General Owen Wynne in 1728
General Gervais Parker 1740–1750
Field Marshal Viscount Molesworth 1751–1758
General Lord Rothes 1758–1767
Lieutenant General William Keppel 1773–1774
General George Augustus Eliott 1774–1775
General Sir John Irwin 1775–1782
Lieutenant-General John Burgoyne 1782–1784
Lieutenant-General Sir William Augustus Pitt 1784–1791
General George Warde 1791–1793
General Lord Rossmore 1793–1796
General Lord Carhampton 1796–1798
Lieutenant-General Sir Ralph Abercromby 1798
General Lord Lake 1798
General Lord Cornwallis 1798–1801
General Sir William Medows 1801–1803
General Henry Edward Fox 1803
General Lord Cathcart 1803–1806
General Lord Harrington 1806–1812
General Lord Hopetoun 1812–1813
General Sir George Hewett 1813–1816
General Sir George Beckwith 1816–1820
General Sir David Baird 1820–1822
General Sir Samuel Auchmuty 1822
Field Marshal Lord Combermere 1822–1825
General Sir George Murray 1825–1828
Field Marshal Lord Strafford 1828–1831
Lieutenant-General Lord Vivian 1831–1836
Field Marshal Sir Edward Blakeney 1836–1855
Field Marshal Lord Seaton 1855–1860
General Sir George Brown 1860–1865
Field Marshal Lord Strathnairn 1865–1870
General Lord Sandhurst 1870–1875
Field Marshal Sir John Michel 1875–1880
General Sir Thomas Steele 1880–1885
Field Marshal Prince Edward of Saxe-Weimar 1885–1890
Field Marshal Lord Wolseley 1890–1895
Field Marshal Lord Roberts 1895–1900
Field Marshal The Duke of Connaught 1900–1904
Field Marshal Lord Grenfell 1904–1908
General Sir Neville Lyttelton 1908–1912
General Sir Arthur Paget 1912–1914
Major-General Sir Lovick Friend 1914–1916
General Sir John Maxwell 1916
Lieutenant-General Sir Bryan Mahon 1916–1918
Lieutenant-General Sir Frederick Shaw 1918–1920
General Sir Nevil Macready 1920–1922

References

 
Senior appointments of the British Army